Denis Roux (born 5 November 1961 in Montreuil) is a former French cyclist.

Roux was professional from 1984 to 1992 and recorded a total of eleven victories including a stage of the Vuelta a España in 1990. He participated in the Tour de France six times. His best result was tenth place in 1988.

After he retired, he became a coach at the Canadian and French Cycling Federation and the sports director of Crédit Agricole. He is married to the French skier Sarah Hemery.

Major results
1983
 1st Overall Tour du Vaucluse
1988
 1st Critérium de Castillon-la-Bataille
 10th Overall Tour de France
1989
 2nd Trophée des Grimpeurs
1990
 9th Overall Critérium du Dauphiné Libéré
 10th Overall Vuelta a España
1st Stage 21
1991
 2nd Overall Tour du Limousin
 8th GP Ouest France-Plouay

Grand Tour results

Tour de France
1985: 56th 
1987: 20th
1988: 10th
1989: DNF
1990: 77th
1991: 16th

Vuelta a España
1986: DNF
1990: 10th (winner of the 21st stage)

References

1961 births
Living people
French male cyclists
French Vuelta a España stage winners